One Minutes are videos of exactly one minute, including credits.  Worldwide, The One Minutes Foundation and partners are organizing exhibitions, country competitions, award ceremonies, TV broadcasts and in 2008 the Olympic One Minutes in Beijing.  One of the activities of The One Minutes is the organization of a yearly award evening.  An independent jury selects nominees per category, the nominated One Minutes are shown and the winners receive a tommy award, fame, glory and if possible a financial reward.

The One Minutes was originally initiated by students of Sandberg Institute in 1998 under direction of Jos Houweling. And has been an independent non-profit since 2017.

In 2002, The One Minutes Jr. was initiated by The One Minutes Foundation, European Cultural Foundation and UNICEF, organising workshops for youngsters all over the world. In 2015 alone, they went to Albania, Azerbaijan, Cambodia, Kyrgyzstan, Myanmar, The Philippines, South Sudan and Ukraine.

The One Minutes Collection consists of over 15,000 video works by artists from more than 120 countries. The collection is preserved by The Netherlands Institute for Sound and Vision and can be searched online.

In 2006, the award evening was held on 19 November in Paradiso, Amsterdam.  Additional award festivals can be organized in other countries by partners of The One Minutes and will be announced on their website.  The Belgian Branch, hosted by the Hogeschool Gent, organizes, in collaboration with the European League of Institutes of the Arts (ELIA), the official Belgian open competition. The Awards were granted October 26 at SPHINX Cinema in Ghent during the ELIA conference 2006. Since 2016, East China Normal University and Shanghai Dragon TV have been organizing the yearly The One Minutes International Competition, which is broadcast by Dragon TV, Shanghai Media Group’ satellite broadcaster. The theme of 2019 was 梦想时空 Dream of the time space.

In 2014, under the direction of Julia van Mourik, The One Minutes Foundation started a new curated programme: The One Minutes Series focusing on the perception and understanding of the moving image. The One Minutes publishes a series of One Minute films every month, inviting a guest artist to conceive and curate a series. Film submissions are sought through an open-call format. The first of these new series was a contemporary remake of John Berger s documentary Ways of Seeing from 1972, called  Ways of Something , compiled by Lorna Mills. The series was purchased in 2017 by Whitney Museum of American Art. Series were also compiled by amongst others Melanie Bonajo, David Claerbout, Khavn de la Cruz, Cécile B. Evans, Quinsy Gario, Samson Kambalu, Nathaniel Mellors, Melvin Moti, and Shana Moulton. In 2019, Harm van den Dorpel curated a series Artificial scarcity which was presented at Stedelijk Museum Amsterdam. In 2020, Annie Sprinkle and Elizabeth Stephens curated a series 'Imagine The Earth Is Your Lover', a document of the ecosex movement.

The One Minutes Series were exhibited amongst others at Art Museum of Nanjing University of the Arts (CN), De Pont Museum of Contemporary Art (NL), Power Station of Art (CN), National Gallery of Iceland in Reykjavík (IS) and Whitney Museum of American Art in New York (USA) and screened at amongst others Durban International Film Festival, International Documentary Film Festival Amsterdam, International Short Film Festival Oberhausen, and Reykjavík International Film Festival.

External links
 http://www.theoneminutes.org
 http://www.theoneminutesjr.org
 http://www.theoneminutes.be

Video